De Nada were a UK garage act active in the early 2000s, fronted by singer Nadia, from Brixton, London. They were signed to Telstar's Wildstar Records, and their two singles, "Love You Anyway" and "Bring It on to My Love", both became top 30 hits in the UK, with the former also reaching No. 7 on the UK Dance Singles Chart.

Discography

Singles
"Love You Anyway" (2001), Wildstar - UK #15, UK Dance #7
"Bring It on to My Love" (2002), Wildstar - UK #24

References

External links

UK garage groups
English dance music groups
Musical groups from London
Telstar Records artists